The 2020–21 Maltese National Amateur League (referred to, for sponsorship reasons, as the BOV National Amateur League), was the third level league football in Malta. This was the first season since the unification of both the Second and Third Divisions into the three group Amateur League system.

Teams 
Twenty-two teams competed in the league.  These were split into three groups, two groups of seven and one of eight.

League stage

Group A

Group B

Group C

Promotion play-offs

Bracket

1st round

Quarter-finals

Semi-finals

Play-offs Final

Championship play-offs

References

External links 
 Official website

Malta
1